Großschweidnitzer Wasser  is a river of Saxony, Germany. It is the left source river of the Löbauer Wasser.

See also
List of rivers of Saxony

Rivers of Saxony
Rivers of Germany